Hamilton River may refer to several places:
Hamilton River (New Zealand), a tributary of Wairau River in New Zealand
Hamilton River (Queensland), a tributary of Georgina River in Australia
Hamilton River (Western Australia), a tributary of Collie River in Australia
Hamilton River, Newfoundland and Labrador, community

See also 
 The Churchill River (Atlantic) also was called Hamilton River up to 1965